The Birbhum Institute of Engineering and Technology or BIET is a government supported engineering college in West Bengal, India. It offers different undergraduate and postgraduate courses in Engineering. It was established in 1999 by a NGO named ICARE under guidance of educationist Padmashri Late Ramaranjan Mukherji, Ex-President of India and then Finance Minister Shri Pranab Mukherjee and Lok Sabha Speaker Shri Somnath Chatterjee.

The college is affiliated with Maulana Abul Kalam Azad University of Technology and all the relevant programmes are approved by the All India Council for Technical Education. The college had a grant from the World Bank under Technical Education Quality Improvement Programme (TEQIP-II).

The campus is located at Suri, Birbhum.

Academics
The institute offers six undergraduate courses:-

B.Tech in Electronics and Communication Engineering (ECE)- 4 years [Approved intake - 60]
B.Tech in Electrical Engineering (EE)- 4 years [Approved intake - 60]
B.Tech in Mechanical Engineering (ME)- 4 years [Approved intake - 120]
B.Tech in Computer Science and Engineering (CSE)- 4 years [Approved intake - 60]
B.Tech in Civil Engineering (CE)- 4 years [Approved intake - 120]

The institute offers two post-graduate courses:

 M.Tech. in Manufacturing technology- 2 years [Approved intake - 18]
 M.Tech. in Heat power engineering- 2 years [Approved intake - 18]

See also

References

External links 
 Birbhum Institute of Engineering & Technology

Colleges affiliated to West Bengal University of Technology
Engineering colleges in West Bengal
Universities and colleges in Birbhum district
1999 establishments in West Bengal
Educational institutions established in 1999